is a Japanese footballer currently playing as a forward for Kagoshima United.

Career statistics

Club
.

Notes

References

1999 births
Living people
Association football people from Yamaguchi Prefecture
Tokuyama University alumni
Japanese footballers
Association football forwards
Kagoshima United FC players